The Reid technique is a method of interrogation. The system was developed in the United States by John E. Reid in the 1950s.  Reid was a polygraph expert and former Chicago police officer.  The technique is known for creating a high pressure environment for the interviewee, followed by sympathy and offers of understanding and help, but only if a confession is forthcoming.  Since its spread in the 1960s, it has been a mainstay of police procedure, especially in the United States.

Proponents of the Reid technique say it is useful in extracting information from otherwise unwilling suspects.  Critics say the technique results in an unacceptably high rate of false confessions, especially from juveniles and the mentally impaired.  Criticism has also been leveled in the opposite case—that against strong-willed interviewees, the technique causes them to stop talking and give no information whatsoever, rather than elicit lies that can be checked against for the guilty or exonerating details for the innocent.

Background
In 1955 in Lincoln, Nebraska, John E. Reid helped gain a confession from a suspect, Darrel Parker, for Parker's wife's murder. This case established Reid's reputation and popularized his technique. Parker recanted his confession the next day, but it was admitted to evidence at his trial. He was convicted by a jury and sentenced to life in prison. He was later determined to be innocent, after another man confessed and was found to have been the perpetrator. Parker sued the state for wrongful conviction; it paid him $500,000 in compensation.

In spite of Parker's false confession, Reid co-authored a text explaining his interrogation techniques. Reid died in 1982 but his company, John E. Reid and Associates, continued: as of 2013, it was led by president Joseph Buckley, who had been hired by Reid. By that year, the company had "trained more interrogators than any other company in the world", and Reid's technique had been adopted by law enforcement agencies of many different types, with it being especially influential in North America.

Process 

The Reid technique consists of a three-phase process beginning with fact analysis, followed by the behavior analysis interview (a non-accusatory interview designed to develop investigative and behavioral information), followed when appropriate by the Reid nine steps of interrogation. According to process guidelines, individuals should be interrogated only when the information developed from the interview and investigation indicate that the subject is involved in the commission of the crime.

In the Reid technique, interrogation is an accusatory process, in which the investigator tells the suspect that the results of the investigation clearly indicate that they did commit the crime in question. The interrogation is in the form of a monologue presented by the investigator rather than a question and answer format. The demeanor of the investigator during the course of an interrogation is ideally understanding, patient, and non-demeaning. The Reid technique user's goal is to make the suspect gradually more comfortable with telling the truth. This is accomplished by the investigator's first imagining and then offering the suspect various psychological constructs as justification for their behavior.

For example, an admission of guilt might be prompted by the question, "Did you plan this out or did it just happen on the spur of the moment?" This is called an alternative question, which is based on an implicit assumption of guilt.  Critics regard this strategy as hazardous, arguing that it is subject to confirmation bias (likely to reinforce inaccurate beliefs or assumptions) and may lead to prematurely narrowing an investigation.

Nine steps of interrogation 
The Reid technique's nine steps of interrogation are:

 Positive confrontation.  Advise the suspect that the evidence has led the police to the individual as a suspect.  Offer the person an early opportunity to explain why the offense took place.
 Try to shift the blame away from the suspect to some other person or set of circumstances that prompted the suspect to commit the crime.  That is, develop themes containing reasons that will psychologically justify or excuse the crime.  Themes may be developed or changed to find one to which the accused is most responsive.
 Try to minimize the frequency of suspect denials.
 At this point, the accused will often give a reason why he or she did not or could not commit the crime. Try to use this to move towards the acknowledgement of what they did.
 Reinforce sincerity to ensure that the suspect is receptive.
 The suspect will become quieter and listen.  Move the theme of the discussion toward offering alternatives.  If the suspect cries at this point, infer guilt.
 Pose the "alternative question", giving two choices for what happened; one more socially acceptable than the other.  The suspect is expected to choose the easier option but whichever alternative the suspect chooses, guilt is admitted.  There is always a third option which is to maintain that they did not commit the crime.
 Lead the suspect to repeat the admission of guilt in front of witnesses and develop corroborating information to establish the validity of the confession.
 Document the suspect's admission or confession and have him or her prepare a recorded statement (audio, video or written).

Validity 
Critics claim the technique too easily produces false confessions, especially with juveniles, with second-language speakers in their non-native language, and with people whose communication/language abilities are affected by mental disabilities, including reduced intellectual capacity.  While this criticism acknowledges that the technique can be "effective" in producing confessions, it is not accurate at getting guilty parties to confess, instead sweeping up people pushed to their mental limits by stress.  Critics also dislike how police often apply the technique on subjects of unclear guilt, when simply gathering more information in non-stressful interrogations can be more useful both for convicting guilty suspects and exonerating innocent suspects.

Of 311 people exonerated through post-conviction DNA testing, more than a quarter had given false confessions—including those convicted in such notorious cases as the Central Park Five.

Some of the more minor details Reid propounded have since been called into question as well.  For example, Reid believed that "tells" such as fidgeting was a sign of lying, and more generally believed that trained police interrogators could intuitively check lies merely by how they were delivered.  Later studies have shown no useful correlation between any sort of body movements such as breaking eye contact or fidgeting and truth-telling.  While police can be effective at cracking lies, it is via gathering contradicting evidence; police officers have shown to be no better than average people at detecting lies merely from their delivery in studies.

Several European countries prohibit some interrogation techniques that are currently allowed in the United States, such as a law enforcement officer lying to a suspect about evidence, due to the perceived risk of false confessions and wrongful convictions that might result, particularly with juveniles. For example, §136a of the German  (StPO, "code of criminal procedure") bans the use of deception and intimidation in interrogations; the Reid method also conflicts with the German police's obligation to adequately inform the suspect of their right to silence.

In Canada, provincial court judge Mike Dinkel ruled in 2012 that "stripped to its bare essentials, the Reid technique is a guilt-presumptive, confrontational, psychologically manipulative procedure whose purpose is to extract a confession".

In December 2013, an unredacted copy of a secret FBI interrogation manual was discovered in the Library of Congress, available for public view. The manual confirmed American Civil Liberties Union concerns that FBI agents used the Reid technique in interrogations.

Abuses of interrogation methods include officers treating accused suspects aggressively and telling them lies about the amount of evidence proving their guilt. Such exaggerated claims of evidence, such as video or genetics, have the potential, when combined with such coercive tactics as threats of harm or promises of leniency, to cause innocent suspects to become psychologically overwhelmed.

In 2015, eight organizations, including John E. Reid & Associates, settled with Juan Rivera, who was wrongfully convicted of the 1992 rape and murder of 11-year-old Holly Staker. A number of pieces of evidence excluded Rivera, including DNA from the PERK (Physical Evidence Recovery Kit) and the report from the electronic ankle monitor he was wearing at the time, as he awaited trial for a non-violent burglary, but he falsely confessed to the Staker crimes after being interrogated by the police several days after taking two polygraph examinations at Reid & Associates. After his exoneration, Rivera filed a suit for false arrest and malicious prosecution. The case was settled out of court with John E. Reid & Associates paying $2 million.

Alternative models
The PEACE (Preparation and Planning, Engage and Explain, Account, Closure and Evaluate) model developed in Britain "encourages more of a dialogue between investigator and suspect".

In 2015, the Royal Canadian Mounted Police adopted a new standard influenced by the PEACE model. Sergeant Darren Carr, who trains police with the new approach, described it as "less Kojak and more Dr. Phil". This approach eschews the use of deceptive information to overwhelm suspects. It emphasizes information gathering over eliciting confessions and discourages investigators from presuming a suspect's guilt.

See also 
 Loaded question
 PEACE method of interrogation
 Suggestive question

References

Further reading

External links 
 "The Reid 9 Steps of Interrogation, in Brief", with key points
 "How Police Interrogation Works" by Julia Layton, HowStuffWorks

Interrogation techniques
Law enforcement in the United States
Law enforcement in Canada